Torgeir Bjørn (born 9 March 1964) is a retired Norwegian cross-country skier.

He represented Alvdal IL. He is a son of Kristian Bjørn. He finished eleventh in the 50 km race at the 1988 Winter Olympics. He also had top-ten finishes in the World Cup.

He later became known as a sports commentator for the Norwegian Broadcasting Corporation.

Cross-country skiing results
All results are sourced from the International Ski Federation (FIS).

Olympic Games

World Championships

World Cup

Season standings

Team podiums
 1 victory 
 2 podiums

References

1964 births
Living people
People from Alvdal
Norwegian male cross-country skiers
Cross-country skiers at the 1988 Winter Olympics
Olympic cross-country skiers of Norway
Norwegian skiing and biathlon commentators
NRK people
Sportspeople from Innlandet